Cacosmia may refer to:

 Cacosmia, a form of the disorder dysosmia, or more specifically parosmia, characterised by an unpleasant smell sensation
 Cacosmia (plant), a genus of flowering plants